The Hillary Coast is a portion of the coast of Antarctica along the western margin of the Ross Ice Shelf between Minna Bluff and Cape Selborne. It was named by the New Zealand Antarctic Place-Names Committee in 1961 for Sir Edmund Hillary, the leader of the New Zealand Party of the Commonwealth Trans-Antarctic Expedition, 1956–58. Various New Zealand parties carried out detailed surveys of portions of this coast and pioneered routes up Skelton Glacier and Darwin Glacier to the polar plateau.

References

 
Coasts of the Ross Dependency
Edmund Hillary